Kathy M. Manderino (born October 28, 1958) is a Democratic politician who serves on the Pennsylvania Gaming Control Board. She was the Secretary of the Pennsylvania Department of Labor and Industry under Governor Tom Wolf from May 2015 until August 2017. Previously, she served as a member of the Pennsylvania House of Representatives who represented the 194th District from 1993 through 2010.

Biography
Manderino's father, James, was a member of the House from 1967 to 1989 and served as the 133rd Speaker of the Pennsylvania House in 1989. In 2003, the political website PoliticsPA named her as a possible successor to House Minority Leader Bill DeWeese.

In 2008, Manderino announced that she would be a candidate for Majority Leader of the House. She was defeated for the post by Todd Eachus. In 2010, Manderino announced her retirement. She was succeeded by fellow Democrat Pamela DeLissio.

In 2015, following the election of Democratic Governor Tom Wolf, Manderino was nominated to serve as Secretary of Labor and Industry of Pennsylvania. She was subsequently confirmed by the Pennsylvania State Senate in May 2015. In July 2017, Governor Wolf announced that Secretary Maderino was leaving her position at Labor and Industry to join the Pennsylvania Gaming Control Board. She has served on the Gaming Control Board since August 1, 2017.

References

External links
Project Vote Smart - Representative Kathy Manderino (PA) profile
Follow the Money - Kathy Manderino
2006 2004 2002 2000 1998 campaign contributions

1958 births
Living people
People from Monessen, Pennsylvania
State cabinet secretaries of Pennsylvania
Democratic Party members of the Pennsylvania House of Representatives
Pennsylvania State University alumni
Politicians from Philadelphia
Temple University alumni
Women state legislators in Pennsylvania
21st-century American women